The Talisman class were a quartet of destroyers ordered for the Ottoman Navy before the First World War, but were taken over in November 1914 and completed for the Royal Navy.

Description
The Talismans were designed by Armstrong Whitworth for the Ottoman Navy, but were sub-contracted to Hawthorn Leslie and Company for building. They displaced . They were powered by three Parsons direct-drive steam turbines, each driving one propeller shaft, using steam provided by three Yarrow boilers. The ships' complement was 102 officers and ratings. The hull form was considered particularly successful and was adopted for the V and W class of 1917, arguably the peak of destroyer development at the time.

The Talisman-class ships were heavily armed for their time, shipping five single QF  Mark IV guns. Two of the guns were side by side on the forecastle. The other guns were carried on the centreline; one between the first and second funnels, one after the searchlight platform and one on a bandstand on the quarterdeck. All the guns had half-shields. The ships were designed to accommodate three above water twin mounts for  torpedoes, but only two mounts were fitted in British service.

Ships
Originally to have been renamed Napier, Narborough, Offa and Ogre respectively, they were re-allocated "T" names in February 1915.

Notes

Bibliography

 
 

Talisman class
 
Destroyer classes